Néstor Valdés Moraga (23 May 1936 – 3 February 2021), sometimes referred as Néstor Valdez, was a Chilean football player and manager.

Career
Born in 1936, as a football player, Valdés was with Colo-Colo in the 1950s, becoming the team captain. His playing career stopped due to a serious inguinal injury. He also played for Deportes Concepción on loan.

At international level, he took part of the Chile national team.

Turned a football manager, he began his career with San Antonio Unido in the 1968 season. He emigrated to Panama and coached the Panama national team from 1969 to 1970, taking part in the 1969 CONCACAF Championship. He became one of the five Chileans who have managed the Panama national team along with Óscar Rendoll Gómez (1946–47/1951–52), Óscar Suman (1949), Hugo Tassara (1972–1973) and Renato Panay (1976–1977).

From 1971 to 1973 he worked in Guatemala, coaching both Suchitepéquez and Aurora at club level and the Guatemala national team in the 1973 CONCACAF Championship. In 1974 he coached Alianza in El Salvador. On 15 December 1977, he coached Guatemala again in a 1–1 draw versus Honduras.

Back in Chile, he was the assistant of Pedro Morales in Colo-Colo at the 1979 Primera División de Chile, where they became champions, and also was the first coach of Deportes Valdivia in 1983.

After his retirement, he was in charge of the Colo-Colo academies until 2002.

Personal life
Valdés was distinguished as a Honorary Member of Colo-Colo.

He was President of Viejos Cracks de Colo-Colo (Old Stars), an association of former players.

References

External links
 Néstor Valdés at CeroaCero 

1936 births
2021 deaths
Chilean footballers
Chile international footballers
Colo-Colo footballers
Deportes Concepción (Chile) footballers
Chilean Primera División players
Chilean football managers
Chilean expatriate football managers
Panama national football team managers
C.D. Suchitepéquez managers
Aurora F.C. managers
Guatemala national football team managers
Deportes Valdivia managers
Primera B de Chile managers
Chilean expatriate sportspeople in Panama
Chilean expatriate sportspeople in Guatemala
Chilean expatriate sportspeople in El Salvador
Expatriate football managers in Panama
Expatriate football managers in Guatemala
Expatriate football managers in El Salvador
Association footballers not categorized by position
Place of birth missing
Place of death missing